Emirates Flight Catering (EKFC) is an in-flight catering service based in Dubai, United Arab Emirates, which provides catering and support services for Emirates Airline and all other airlines based at Dubai International Airport. It is a subsidiary of The Emirates Group.

EKFC directly employs over 11,000 staff, and operates from Emirates Flight Catering Centre which has a capacity of producing over 225,000 meals daily. The Company provided 55 million meals in 2017, with an average daily meal uplift of 180,000.

History

Emirates Flight Catering was formed out of Emirates Abela Catering Company in 2003. It now produces more than 55 million meals per year and has a fleet of 295 high loader trucks and 89 special vehicle for the Airbus A380.

In July 2005, EKFC began operations at its new Food Point facility, a  facility capable of producing 30 million meals annually.

In early 2006, EKFC began operations at a new catering facility dedicated to service the flights of Emirates Airline. The facility can produce over 115,000 meals daily. The older facility is now used to serve all 120 of the international airlines operating out of Dubai Airport, as well as providing catering for 25 lounges at Dubai Airports. Also in 2006, EKFC  expanded its Linencraft laundering plant.

Subsidiaries

Food Point
Food Point is a catering facility based at Dubai Investment Park that opened in July 2005. It is another food production facility, and can produce over 30 million meals annually. Food Point was designed and its project managed by European Projects, a UK-based specialist food design company that has since become International Food Systems Ltd.

Linencraft
Linencraft is a laundering facility with a total area of  located at Dubai Investment Park. Since the expansion to a processing volume of up to 80 tons per day in 2007, the facility is now able to process 210 tons of laundry and dry cleaning output per day.

References

External links
Official website
Parent company

Airline catering
Catering and food service companies of the United Arab Emirates
2003 establishments in the United Arab Emirates
Food and drink companies established in 2003
The Emirates Group